Fast Times at Ridgemont High is a 1982 American coming-of-age comedy film directed by Amy Heckerling (in her feature directorial debut) from a screenplay by Cameron Crowe, based on his 1981 book Fast Times at Ridgemont High: A True Story, and starring Sean Penn, Jennifer Jason Leigh, Judge Reinhold, Phoebe Cates, Brian Backer, Robert Romanus, Ray Walston, Amanda Wyss, Scott Thompson, and Vincent Schiavelli. Crowe went undercover at Clairemont High School in San Diego and wrote about his experiences.

The film chronicles a school year in the lives of sophomores Stacy Hamilton and Mark Ratner and their older friends Linda Barrett and Mike Damone, both of whom believe themselves wiser in the ways of romance than their younger counterparts. The ensemble cast of characters form two subplots with Jeff Spicoli, a perpetually stoned surfer, facing off against history teacher Mr. Hand, and Stacy's older brother Brad, a senior who works in entry-level jobs to pay for his car and ponders ending his two-year relationship with his girlfriend, Lisa.

In addition to Penn, Reinhold, Cates, and Leigh, the film marks early appearances by several actors who later became stars, including Nicolas Cage, Eric Stoltz, Forest Whitaker, and Anthony Edwards (the first two in their feature film debuts).

In 2005, the film was selected for preservation in the United States National Film Registry by the Library of Congress as being "culturally, historically, or aesthetically significant".

Plot
In the town of Ridgemont are different stories taking place in its teenager community:

Brad's story
Brad Hamilton is a popular senior at Ridgemont High School, a fictional school in the San Fernando Valley, and looks forward to his final year of school. He has a job at All-American Burger, his 1960 Buick LeSabre is almost paid for, and plans to break up with his girlfriend Lisa so he can be completely eligible during his senior year. His perfect life is threatened after an exchange with an obnoxious customer results in his firing from "All-American Burger". When Brad tries to tell Lisa how much he needs her, she informs him that she wants to break up with him to date other guys. Brad gets a job at "Captain Hook Fish & Chips", but quits in humiliation when a beautiful older woman laughs at him wearing a pirate costume while making a food delivery.

Stacy's story
Brad's sister Stacy is a 15-year-old freshman and a virgin. She works at Perry's Pizza at Ridgemont Mall alongside her outspoken older friend, Linda Barrett. One night at work, Stacy takes an order from Ron Johnson who asks her out after she tells him she's 19. She later sneaks out of her house for a date with him and loses her virginity that night in the dugout of a baseball field. Stacy later tells Linda about the experience, stating how much it hurt. Linda offers advice to Stacy on the matter, which she often does, as the more worldly and experienced of the two. Ron sends her flowers the next day.

Mike's story
Mike Damone is a smooth-talker who earns money taking sports bets and scalping concert tickets; he fancies himself a worldly ladies' man. His shy but amiable best friend, Mark Ratner, works as an usher at the movie theater across from Perry's Pizza. When Mark develops a crush on Stacy, Damone lets Mark in on his five secrets for picking up girls. Damone later persuades Mark to ask Stacy out on a date to a German restaurant. Afterwards, at her home, Stacy invites Mark into her bedroom, where they look at her photo album together. They begin to kiss, but a nervous Mark abruptly leaves after Stacy attempts to seduce him. She mistakenly interprets his shyness as disinterest. Linda quickly advises her to move on and find another boy. After he drops by her house unannounced, Stacy becomes interested in Damone. She invites him to her pool, which quickly leads to them having sex in the pool house during which he ejaculates very quickly. Her brother Brad, who has become sullen and withdrawn since his breakup with Lisa and the loss of his job at "All-American Burger", is caught masturbating in the bathroom by Linda after he fantasizes about her exposing her breasts to him at the pool.

Stacy later informs Damone that he has gotten her pregnant, and he tells her she wanted sex more than he did, which she denies. She asks for him to cover half the cost of an abortion and provide her with a ride to the clinic, and he agrees. However, unable to come up with his half despite attempts to call in debts owed from his business dealings, Damone abandons Stacy on the day of her appointment. She lies and asks her brother Brad to drive her to a bowling alley to meet friends, but he sees her cross the street to the abortion clinic. Brad waits for Stacy and he confronts her about the abortion. Stacy makes Brad promise not to tell their parents, but does not divulge who got her pregnant. When Stacy tells Linda that Damone abandoned her and did not pay his half, Linda becomes furious. The next day, Damone finds his car spray-painted "Prick" and his school locker painted "little prick" as revenge. Mark confronts Damone about his involvement with Stacy. They almost get into a fight, but their gym teacher breaks it up.

Jeff's story
Jeff Spicoli is a carefree stoner and surfer who runs afoul of history teacher Mr. Hand and attending Mr. Vargas' science class. One night, Spicoli wrecks the 1979 Chevrolet Camaro of Ridgemont star football player Charles Jefferson during a joyride with Jefferson's younger brother. Spicoli covers up the damage by making it look like the car was destroyed by fans of Ridgemont's sports rival Lincoln High School. When Ridgemont plays Lincoln, Jefferson, furious about his car, brutally tackles several of Lincoln's players and almost single-handedly wins the game. Spicoli joins the science class of Mr. Vargas on a class trip to the morgue. On the evening of the graduation dance, Mr. Hand visits Spicoli's house and informs him that he must make up the eight hours of class time he has wasted over the school year. They have a history session that lasts until Mr. Hand is satisfied that Spicoli has understood the lesson, and the two show that they respect each other.

Epilogue
Mark and Stacy start dating again as Mark makes peace with his best friend Damone. Brad takes a job at a convenience store called Mi-T-Mart and foils an armed robbery with some help from an oblivious Spicoli who was using the bathroom.

A postscript states that Brad was promoted to manager of Mi-T-Mart. Damone was busted scalping Ozzy Osbourne tickets and was forced to take a job at 7-Eleven. Mr. Vargas has gone back to coffee. Linda attends college in Riverside and moved in with her abnormal-psychology professor. Mark and Stacy are going steady and haven't gone all the way yet. Mr. Hand maintains his belief that everyone is on dope. Spicoli saved Brooke Shields from drowning and blew the reward money hiring rock band Van Halen to play at his birthday party.

As the credits roll, Mi-T-Mart and Ridgemont Mall close for the night.

Cast

Other minor appearances include:
 Martin Brest as Dr. Miller
 Stu Nahan as himself
 Pamela Springsteen as Dina Phillips
 Lana Clarkson as Mrs. Vargas
 Nancy Wilson as a beautiful girl in a car
 Stuart Cornfeld as the Pirate King, the proprietor of "Captain Hook's Fish & Chips"
 Taylor Negron as the pizza delivery person from the "Pizza Guy" restaurant

Production

Development
The film is adapted from a book Crowe wrote after a year spent at Clairemont High School in San Diego, California. He went undercover to do research for his 1981 book Fast Times at Ridgemont High: A True Story, about his observations of the high school and the students he befriended there, including then-student Andy Rathbone, on whom the character Mark "Rat" Ratner was modeled.

Casting
Nicolas Cage made his feature-film debut, portraying an unnamed co-worker of Brad's at All-American Burger, credited as "Nicolas Coppola." It was also the film debut for Eric Stoltz and provided early roles for Anthony Edwards and Forest Whitaker. Crowe's future wife Nancy Wilson of Heart has a cameo as the "Beautiful Girl in Car" who laughs at Brad in his Captain Hook uniform during a traffic-light stop. Tom Hanks was considered for the role of Brad Hamilton. Justine Bateman was offered the role of Linda Barrett, but she turned it down to star in Family Ties. Matthew Broderick was offered the role of Jeff Spicoli, but turned it down. Jodie Foster was considered for the role of Stacy Hamilton.

Soundtrack

The soundtrack album Fast Times at Ridgemont High: Music from the Motion Picture was released by Elektra Records on July 30, 1982. It peaked at #54 on the US Billboard 200 album chart. The soundtrack features the work of many quintessential 1980s rock artists.

Several of the movie's songs were released as singles, including Jackson Browne's "Somebody's Baby", which reached #7 on the Billboard Hot 100 singles chart. Other singles were the title track by Sammy Hagar, a cover of The Tymes' "So Much in Love" by Timothy B. Schmit which reached #59 on the Billboard Hot 100 singles chart, "Raised on the Radio" by the Ravyns and "Waffle Stomp" by Joe Walsh. In addition to Schmit and Walsh, the album features solo tracks by other members of the Eagles: Don Henley and Don Felder. The soundtrack also included "I Don't Know (Spicoli's Theme)" by Jimmy Buffett and "Goodbye Goodbye" by Oingo Boingo (led by Danny Elfman).

Five tracks in the film not included on the soundtrack are "Moving in Stereo" by the Cars; "American Girl" by Tom Petty and the Heartbreakers; "We Got the Beat" by the Go Go's, which is the movie's opening theme; Led Zeppelin's "Kashmir"; and "Jingle Bell Rock" by Bobby Helms. In addition, the live band at the prom dance during the end of the film played two songs also not on the soundtrack: The Eagles' "Life in the Fast Lane" and Sam the Sham's "Wooly Bully".

The Donna Summer track "Highway Runner", was recorded in 1981 for her double album titled I'm a Rainbow; however, the album was shelved by Geffen Records but ultimately released in 1996 by Mercury Records.

Todd Rundgren also recorded the song "Attitude" for the film at Crowe's request. It was not included in the film, but was released on Rundgren's Demos and Lost Albums in 2001. A track titled "Fast Times" was recorded by Heart but was not used in the film. The track ended up on their 1982 album Private Audition.

In some countries, the album was released as a single LP with 10 tracks.

Heckerling, in the DVD audio commentary, states that the 1970s artists, like the Eagles, were introduced by one of the film's producers. Coincidentally, Irving Azoff, one of the film's producers, was the personal manager for the Eagles and Stevie Nicks.

Track listing

Reception

Box office
Universal gave the film a limited theatrical release on August 13, 1982, opening in 498 theaters. It earned $2.5 million in its opening weekend. The release was widened to 713 theaters, earning $3.25 million. The film ranked 29th among U.S. releases in 1982, earning $27.1 million, six times its $4.5 million budget, and later gaining popularity through television and home video releases.

Critical response
On the review aggregator website Rotten Tomatoes, 78% of 60 critics' reviews are positive, with an average rating of 6.7/10. The website's consensus reads, "While Fast Times at Ridgemont High features Sean Penn's legendary performance, the film endures because it accurately captured the small details of school, work, and teenage life." 

Roger Ebert called it a "scuz-pit of a movie", but praised the performances by Leigh, Penn, Cates, and Reinhold. Janet Maslin wrote that it was "a jumbled but appealing teen-age comedy with something of a fresh perspective on the subject."

As time went on, however, the film was increasingly seen as a classic. In an essay written for the Criterion Collection edition in 2021, critic Dana Stevens wrote, "Fast Times is the polar opposite of exploitation. Deep in its horny heart, this is the story of one fifteen-year-old girl’s clumsy and sometimes painful introduction to the world of sex, related without judgment or preconception or the least hint of sentimentalization. Heckerling’s film is a raunchy crowd-pleaser replete with stoner humor, a masturbation gag, and a blow-job tutorial that makes use of school-cafeteria carrots. But it is also attuned to the emotional lives of teenagers—girls and boys—in ways that place it far ahead of its time."

Accolades
 
Crowe's screenplay was nominated for a WGA Award for best comedy adapted from another medium. The film ranks No. 15 on Bravo's "100 Funniest Movies" and No. 2 on Entertainment Weekly's list of the "50 Best High School Movies".

The film is recognized by American Film Institute in these lists:
 2000: AFI's 100 Years...100 Laughs – #87

National Film Preservation Board
 2005: National Film Registry, Fast Times at Ridgemont High

Television spin-off

The film inspired a short-lived 1986 television series titled Fast Times. Ray Walston and Vincent Schiavelli reprised their roles as Hand and Vargas on the show. Other characters from the movie were played by different actors, most notably Patrick Dempsey as Mike Damone.

See also

 Fast Times at Barrington High, an album by the band The Academy Is... is a play on the title of the film.
 "Fast Times at Buddy Cianci Jr. High", a Family Guy episode from Season 4.
 Fast Times at Fairmont High, a novella by Vernor Vinge, is named in reference to the film.
 "Stacy's Mom", a song by Fountains of Wayne which pays homage to the film.
 The Last American Virgin, a remake of Lemon Popsicle and a film released in the same year with similar themes.
"Phoebe Cates" from the album Lechuza, a song by the band Fenix TX about Phoebe Cates' role in the film.

References

External links

 
 
 
 Fast Times at Ridgemont High essay by Daniel Eagan in America's Film Legacy: The Authoritative Guide to the Landmark Movies in the National Film Registry, A&C Black, 2010 , pages 777-778 
Fast Times at Ridgemont High: A Kid’s-Eye View an essay by Dana Stevens at the Criterion Collection

1982 films
1982 comedy films
1982 directorial debut films
1980s coming-of-age comedy films
1980s high school films
1980s sex comedy films
1980s teen comedy films
American coming-of-age comedy films
American high school films
American sex comedy films
American teen comedy films
1980s English-language films
Films about abortion
Films about virginity
Films adapted into television shows
Films directed by Amy Heckerling
Films set in California
Films produced by Art Linson
Films shot in Los Angeles
Films about proms
Films with screenplays by Cameron Crowe
Stoner films
Teen sex comedy films
Juvenile sexuality in films
Teenage pregnancy in film
United States National Film Registry films
Universal Pictures films
1980s American films
Films set in shopping malls